Stages is a live album by Canadian hard rock band Triumph, released on October 14, 1985 by MCA Records. The tracks were recorded from various performances over the prior three years 1981–1984 although two new studio tracks were added: "Mind Games" and "Empty Inside".

Original LP and cassette track listing

Side 1 (First Record)

 "When the Lights Go Down" (Gil Moore, Michael Levine, Rik Emmett) – 6:00
 "Never Surrender" (Rik Emmett, Michael Levine, Gil Moore) – 6:43
 "Allied Forces" (Gil Moore, Michael Levine, Rik Emmett) – 5:07
 "Hold On" (Rik Emmett) – 4:21

Side 2 (First Record)

 "Magic Power" (Rik Emmett, Michael Levine, Gil Moore) – 6:12
 "Rock & Roll Machine" (Gil Moore) – 10:20
 "Lay it on the Line" (Rik Emmett) – 5:03

Side 1 (Second Record)

 "A World of Fantasy" (Rik Emmett, Michael Levine, Gil Moore, Tam Patrick) – 4:18
 "Druh Mer Selbo" (Gil Moore) – 4:12
 "Midsummer's Daydream" (Rik Emmett) – 2:42
 "Spellbound" (Gil Moore, Michael Levine, Rik Emmett) – 3:56
 "Follow Your Heart" (Gil Moore, Michael Levine, Rik Emmett) – 3:37

Side 2 (Second Record)

 "Fight the Good Fight" (Rik Emmett, Michael Levine, Gil Moore) – 7:36
 "Mind Games" (Gil Moore, Michael Levine, Rik Emmett) – 4:49
 "Empty Inside" (Rik Emmett, Michael Levine, Gil Moore) – 4:04

Original CD track listing
 "When the Lights Go Down" (Gil Moore, Michael Levine, Rik Emmett) – 6:00
 "Never Surrender" (Rik Emmett, Michael Levine, Gil Moore) – 6:43
 "Hold On" (Rik Emmett) – 4:21
 "Magic Power" (Rik Emmett, Michael Levine, Gil Moore) – 6:12
 "Rock & Roll Machine" (Gil Moore) – 10:20
 "Lay it on the Line" (Rik Emmett) – 5:03
 "A World of Fantasy" (Rik Emmett, Michael Levine, Gil Moore, Tam Patrick) – 4:14
 "Midsummer's Daydream" (Rik Emmett) – 2:42
 "Spellbound" (Gil Moore, Michael Levine, Rik Emmett) – 3:56
 "Follow Your Heart" (Gil Moore, Michael Levine, Rik Emmett) – 3:37
 "Fight the Good Fight" (Rik Emmett, Michael Levine, Gil Moore) – 7:36
 "Mind Games" (Gil Moore, Michael Levine, Rik Emmett) – 4:49
 "Empty Inside" (Rik Emmett, Michael Levine, Gil Moore) – 4:04

Remastered CD track listing
 "When the Lights Go Down" (Gil Moore, Michael Levine, Rik Emmett) – 6:00
 "Never Surrender" (Rik Emmett, Michael Levine, Gil Moore) – 6:43
 "Hold On" (Rik Emmett) – 4:21
 "Magic Power" (Rik Emmett, Michael Levine, Gil Moore) – 6:12
 "Rock & Roll Machine" (Gil Moore) – 10:20
 "Lay it on the Line" (Rik Emmett) – 5:03
 "A World of Fantasy (Druh Mer Selbo)" (Rik Emmett, Michael Levine, Gil Moore, Tam Patrick) – 8:15
 "Midsummer's Daydream" (Rik Emmett) – 2:42
 "Spellbound" (Gil Moore, Michael Levine, Rik Emmett) – 3:56
 "Follow Your Heart" (Gil Moore, Michael Levine, Rik Emmett) – 3:37
 "Fight the Good Fight" (Rik Emmett, Michael Levine, Gil Moore) – 7:36
 "Mind Games" (Gil Moore, Michael Levine, Rik Emmett) – 4:49
 "Empty Inside" (Rik Emmett, Michael Levine, Gil Moore) – 4:04

Personnel
 Rik Emmett – guitars, vocals
 Gil Moore – drums, percussion, vocals
 Michael Levine – bass, keyboards
 Gary McCracken – drums on "Mind Games" due to Gil Moore's arm injury
 Rob Yale – keyboards

Production
 Ed Stone – mixing
 Hugh Cooper – engineer
 Dave Runstedler – assistant engineer
 Noel Golden – assistant engineer
 Brian Hewson – vocal recording
 Brett Zilahi – digital re–mastering
 Paul Natkin – photography
 Rodney Bowes – photography
 Dimo Safari – photography
 Nick Sangiamo – photography
 Ross Marino – photography
 Bruce Kessler – photography
 Patrick Harbron – photography
 Phil Regendanz – photography
Raj Rama – album cover photo

Charts

Certifications

External links
Stages Entry At Official Triumph Homepage
Info At Fan Site
Barnes And Noble

References

Triumph (band) albums
1985 live albums